Something About Secret is a 1999 Chinese drama film directed by Huang Jianxin. It stars Wang Zhiwen and Jiang Shan as a middle-class couple whose happy marriage begins to crumble after the wife commits a hit and run while driving under the influence.

Cast
Jiang Shan as He Liying
Wang Zhiwen as Li Guoqiang, He Liying's husband
Su Qifeng as Li Jia, He Liying's son
Wang Lin as Sha Ping, He Liying's former classmate and best friend
Ruan Danning as Li Xiaoya, Li Guoqiang's younger sister
Liu Zifeng as Xia Gong, Li Guoqiang's colleague
Zhu Yin as Xia Gong's wife
Wu Yue as Zheng Chang, Li Guoqiang's colleague
Zhang Jianhong as the Victim
Hou Yaqi as the Victim's daughter
Ju Hao as the Victim's husband
Da Shichang as Party secretary
Niu Piao as Feng Jian
Hou Chuangao as Fan, He Liying's former classmate
Mao Wei as Guan, He Liying's former classmate
Xu Zheng as Zhang, He Liying's chauffeur
Qian Zhi as the mechanic
Niu Zhenhua as Huang
Chang Xueren as Li Guoqiang's father
Lu Zaiyun as Li Guoqiang's mother
He Saifei as employee in He Liying's firm
Faye Yu as Li Xiaoya's classmate

Awards and nominations

References

External links

Films directed by Huang Jianxin
1990s Mandarin-language films
Films shot in Zhejiang
Chinese drama films
Films with screenplays by Si Wu
1999 drama films